Jaime Peraire (Catalan language: Jaume Peraire i Guitart), a native of Barcelona, is the H. N. Slater Professor of Aeronautics and Astronautics and former head of the Department of Aeronautics and Astronautics at the Massachusetts Institute of Technology. He specializes in computational aspects of aeronautics and astronautics, and is interested in improved teaching methods in various fields of engineering.

Education
 Ingeniero de Caminos, Canales y Puertos, 1983, Polytechnic University of Catalonia. (Entry degree in civil engineering)
 PhD, University of Wales, 1983.
 Doctor Ingeniero de Caminos, Canales y Puertos, 1987, University of Barcelona. (Doctorate in civil engineering)

Career
Peraire is the H. N. Slater Professor of Aeronautics and Astronautics at the Massachusetts Institute of Technology. He served as head of the department from 2011 until 2018. He is on the faculty of MIT's Aerospace Computational Design Laboratory. Previously he was a faculty member at the University of Wales and at Imperial College, London. He is a Fellow of both the American Institute of Aeronautics and Astronautics and  the International Association for Computational Mechanics. His research interests include numerical analysis, finite element methods, and computational aerodynamics. His teaching interests are computational mechanics, numerical methods for partial differential equations, and dynamics.

He is active in the international CDIO Initiative, an educational framework stressing engineering fundamentals.

Honors and awards
Among his honors and awards are:
 Department of Aeronautics and Astronautics, MIT, Raymond L. Bisplinghoff Faculty Fellow,  2003-2006
 Honorary Professor, School of Engineering, University of Wales, Swansea, 2005
 H.N. Slater Professor of Aeronautics and Astronautics, MIT, 2011
 Spanish Society for Numerical Methods in Engineering, SEMNI Prize, 2013
 Catalan Civil Engineers Association, Ildefons Cerdá Medal, 2015
 US Association for Computational Mechanics, T.J. Hughes Medal, 2015
 Polytechnic University of Catalonia, Honorary Doctorate, 2022

Publications
Peraire is the author of more than 250 articles and conference papers in his field.

Notes

References

External links 
 MIT Aeronautics and Astronautics Department

Living people
Date of birth missing (living people)
MIT School of Engineering faculty
Alumni of the University of Wales
University of Barcelona alumni
1960 births